Air Force Plant 4 is a government-owned, contractor-operated  aerospace facility in Fort Worth, Texas, currently owned by the U.S. Air Force and operated by Lockheed Martin Aeronautics.  It is home to the F-16 and F-35 fighter aircraft.  Military aircraft have been manufactured here since 1942.  Plant 4 is adjacent to Naval Air Station Joint Reserve Base Fort Worth, formerly Carswell Air Force Base.

Overview 
Air Force Plant 4 is one of the largest employers in the area with a staff of approximately 17,000 people. Air Force Plant 4 is located within the Fort Worth-Arlington Metropolitan Statistical Area which includes Johnson, Parker and Tarrant Counties. The area is characterized as a highly urbanized area with a diverse economic base concentrated in the manufacturing, service and retail industries. With a large number of defense industries and their associated supply and service businesses, the community has been greatly affected by the recent reduction in defense expenditures.

History 
Plant 4's origins begin in May 1940 when the Fort Worth Chamber of Commerce was trying to convince aircraft manufacturers to build an aircraft assembly plant in the Fort Worth area to support the massive expansion of the Army Air Corps.

Fleet and Consolidated Aircraft, wanting to build in the area, suggested to the Air Corps that they jointly build an airfield adjacent to the heavy bomber plant they wanted to build in Fort Worth.  It was suggested that the Air Corps would benefit by having a joint facility.   Local officials promised to spend money to build an airport on the land next to the plant and lease it to the Air Corps.    After some objections to this, another suggestion to deed the Air Corps the land was made was accepted, and on 16 June 1941, President Franklin D. Roosevelt approved $1.75 million to construct a military airfield (Fort Worth Army Airfield) next to the Consolidated manufacturing plant.

World War II 
The B-24 Liberator was first proposed to the Air Corps in 1938, and with the start of World War II in Europe, the French Government placed an order for 60 aircraft, sight unseen.  In 1940, Britain ordered 164. These large foreign orders were placed well before the US military placed similar-sized orders, and played a large role in getting the B-24 project going.

In order to meet the projected demand for the B-24, in early 1941 the government established the Liberator Production Pool Program. Under this program, Consolidated would produce Liberators at the new plant in Fort Worth to supplement the B-24 production in its main San Diego plant.  Sub-assemblies and components of B-24Ds would first be sent to Fort Worth and assembled from smaller plants until Fort Worth could produce the complete aircraft.   Three designations of the Liberator, B-24D, B-24E, and B-24G would be flown to Fort Worth from Consolidated production lines in San Diego, Willow Run, Michigan and North American Aircraft in Dallas.    At Fort Worth, the aircraft would be processed through what was called a "modification center" where the aircraft would be updated with the latest modifications before being turned over to the Air Force and flown out from the Fort Worth Army Airfield, which it shared a common airfield with.  Over 3,000 B-24 aircraft were manufactured,  assembled and modified during the war.

In February 1943, the Army directed Consolidated to shift its production of the B-32 Dominator very heavy bomber from San Diego to Fort Worth, to streamline PBY Catalina production in San Diego for the Navy.   The B-32 program, however, was beset with technical problems and by the end of December 1944, only five aircraft had been delivered. In comparison, the B-29 Superfortress had been in combat for nearly six months.   Before the program's termination in September 1945, only 124 B-32s were produced in Fort Worth.

Cold War 

In 1942, Consolidated decided to manufacture its very long range bomber, the XB-36 Peacemaker, in Fort Worth. Although the USAAF approved this plan, it caused a delay of several months in the XB-36 project; since all the drawings, the mockup, the engineers, and the tooling had to be moved from San Diego to Texas. Unfortunately, progress on the XB-36 was still slow, and by the middle of 1944, B-29s were attacking Japan regularly from bases in the Mariana Islands. Although the B-36 project would still continue, it would now do so with a lower priority. Following the surrender of Germany and the end of the war in Europe, aircraft production contracts were drastically cut back. However, the contract for the B-36 was untouched. The enormous losses suffered in seizing island bases in the Pacific convinced the USAAF that there was still a definite need for a very long-range bomber.

The first XB-36 (42-13570) was rolled out of the Fort Worth factory on 8 September 1945, and took off from Fort Worth on its maiden flight on 8 August 1946. The B-36 was in production at Fort Worth until the last B-36J was rolled out on 14 August 1954; 385 of these were ultimately built.

Consolidated Aircraft became Convair, following a merger in 1943. Convair was itself acquired by General Dynamics in 1953.

Beginning in the late 1940s, Air Materiel Command, requested that work begin on a new jet- powered medium bomber that would be ready for service by the late 1950s. After years of development, a medium jet bomber Convair's XB-58, was accepted by the Air Force in December 1955 for thirteen aircraft, which would be built at Plant 4 in Fort Worth. Technical problems and testing by Air Force Systems Command meant that the first production aircraft were not delivered until 1959. The aircraft remained in production until 1964 when the Air Force decided to phase the aircraft out of the inventory.

The company's proposal for the Tactical Fighter Experimental project (TFX) was accepted in 1962, with the fighter seeing production as the General Dynamics F-111.  By 1966, the plant had expanded to 4.7 million square feet, and by 1968 it had expanded further to 6.5 million square feet, to accommodate production of the F-111. Plant 4 built 562 of the aircraft by the time production ended, in 1976.

In the early 1970s, the YF-16 was designed and built at Fort Worth, and the USAF accepted its first F-16 on August 17, 1978. The Fighting Falcon is one of the most successful military aircraft ever produced, with major production continuing until the early 2000s and support components of the aircraft still being produced.

Current use 
When General Dynamics sold its aircraft manufacturing interests to Lockheed Martin it included the operation of Plant 4, which eventually would house Lockheed Martin Aeronautics' divisional headquarters.  As of the end of the Cold War, the plant was fabricating, assembling, and testing the F-16 for the USAF and many allied nations. The last of 3,620 F-16s was built there in late 2017 after more than 39 years and then production moved to another factory in Greenville, South Carolina. In March 1992  Lockheed began to produce F-22 Raptor aircraft components at the facility. Additionally, the plant produces spare aircraft parts, radar units, and missile components.

Today the F-35 Lightning II Joint Strike Fighter is being produced on the assembly line at the plant.

Pollution 
Air Force Plant 4 has been listed as a Superfund site since 1990. It was discovered a significant trichloroethylene plume had contaminated local soil and groundwater. Remediation efforts are still underway.

See also 

 Air Force Plant 6, Marietta, Georgia
 Air Force Plant 42, Palmdale, California
 Naval Air Station Fort Worth Joint Reserve Base
 Carswell Air Force Base

References 

Buildings and structures in Fort Worth, Texas
Superfund sites in Texas
Military Superfund sites
Plants of the United States Air Force
Lockheed Martin-associated military facilities
Military in Fort Worth, Texas